MacGregor canal was built between 1903 and 1904 during the colonial administration of William MacGregor, a medical doctor and Governor of the Colony of Lagos during the period of construction. The project was initiated as part of MacGregor's effort to reduce mosquitoe infestation through reclamation of swampy land in Southwest Ikoyi and Onikan, Lagos Island.. The twenty five feet wide canal was built to drain the swamp and in addition quarried to provide soil for the reclamation project. The canal cut across Ikoyi and parts of Onikan, Lagos Island, providing a border between Lagos Island and Ikoyi. To link both communities, a bridge was built over the canal from Obalende, a settlement that was part of the newly reclaim swampland. 

In the 1970s, parts of the canal were sand filled to build an inner ring road around Lagos Island.

References

History of Lagos
Buildings and structures in Lagos
Canals in Lagos